Londrigan railway station was a railway station on the closed Bright railway line in Victoria, Australia. Although no trace of the former station exists, a signboard has been erected to mark the site of the station as part of a rail trail project.

Disused railway stations in Victoria (Australia)